Rede 21 (Portuguese for 21 Network) is a Brazilian television network, launched on October 21, 1996 (relaunched on July 7, 2008), as Canal 21, broadcasting only for São Paulo. It grew to a network in 2003 with the addition of the TV Brasília affiliation. Before this, Salvador and Macapá pass to have the 21 signal. In 2003, Rio de Janeiro received the 21 on channel 54 UHF by retransmission, but shut down at the end of 2005.

In 2005, the network nationally broadcast five hours, from 7pm to 12am, but had good quality. Most part of this schedule was occupied by Japanese cartoons and American series like Sex and the City, The X-Files and That '70s Show.

Rise and decline 
The network had presence in 14 cities in 2004, but in this time of the year lost affiliates in Porto Alegre, Belo Horizonte, Vitória and Rio de Janeiro.

At the end of 2005, the small schedule and prime time from 7pm at 12am was further reduced. The newscast host and the Blog 21 hosts were fired and was canceled the programs Top of the Pops, Doc 21 (with the National Geographic documentaries), the sitcom Seinfeld and Top of the Pops Brasil and put on air the Gamecorp programs.

On June 5, 2006, Rede 21 shut down and Play TV was put in its place.

Rede 21's return 
After two years off the air, on July 7, 2008, Rede 21 came back on, after the disaccord between Grupo Bandeirantes and Gamecorp.

External links 
 

Grupo Bandeirantes de Comunicação
Television networks in Brazil
Mass media in São Paulo
1996 establishments in Brazil
Television channels and stations established in 1996
2006 disestablishments in Brazil
Television channels and stations disestablished in 2006